Antonio Breschi, also known as Antóni O’Breskey (born in Florence, Italy 1950, with Argentine roots) is a composer, pianist and trumpet player, singer, writer, poet and music educator.
Oliver Sweeney, in the Irish music magazine Hot Press, wrote of him: “He is a genius whose music is without frontiers, and whose originality makes him one of the most innovative artists in the varied musical genres of today.”
As composer and pianist he is very original and eclectic, and he composed enormous varieties of music, creating a very personal style: “one of the most exciting sounds we have heard in years" (The 20th Queen Festival at Queen, Belfast 1981).
His compositions for cello and piano and for oboe and piano as well as his world music became soundtracks for films, television programs, theatre and ballets.

His album "Ode to Ireland" won the award for the best album of the year. His roots are classical music and jazz, but he began to explore many other ethnic traditions. He was also an anticipator of minimalism and many other styles:
“The categories of “World” and “New Age” music did not exist when Breschi began his trailblazing journey”.
He is also a jazz innovator introducing piano in a creative way, mixing Irish and Flamenco music together with blues. Later he did the same with the Italian Pizzica and Taranta traditional music. He also developed a new trumpet sound mixing Irish sean-nós and blues, as Harry Long describes in his music anthology: 
“Breschi’s unique approach [...] the playing is superb and his style successfully combines Irish traditional and blues styles”.
He has been breaking barriers among many different kinds of music, “yet he was the first to combine Flamenco, Basque, Arabic, Latin and Irish elements, his virtuoso jazz-styled piano uniting these traditions in remarkably original compositions.” With his work "Orekan: The Ethnic Symphony" he created a new “symphonic” concept bringing together piano (the top classical instrument which started the new “well tempered” system) with a vast variety of "not tempered” instruments, belonging to many different ethnic traditions.

For many years and predating the times he was gathering together extraordinary musicians from all over the world, and recording more than 25 albums which form "The Nomadic Piano Collection".
About his ability to anticipate the times, Oliver Sweeney in the Hot Press said about his work Orekan: “Orekan is not only a masterpiece gathered together by the peculiar genius of Antóni O’Breskey; it is above all a unique social document which gives us a strong idea of our roots, and in addition points out a few possible roads we might take in the future”.
He is also known  to be the inspirer of the show Riverdance:
“Bill Whelan developed Breschi’s synthesis of Flamenco, jazz and Irish traditional strands as a key structure in his Irish music and dance spectacular, Riverdance.”;
“Well pre-dating Riverdance.”;
“Ahead of his time… in 1979 Antóni O’ released a track called “Sunrise”, some of which sounds almost exactly like Riverdance” (Victoria Clarke, Sunday Independent). The track “Sunrise” was composed with the contribution of his great friend and musician Velemir Dugina.

For this and many other reasons in various concerts his contribution to Irish music and culture was celebrated in the National Concert Hall in Dublin.
In 2008 the Swiss National Radio Television presented his book "Heyoka: The Soul Shaster" with a big evening and concert, and through the notes and the reading, recalled and celebrated all his career as composer, performer, music educator, and his social work through music with Italian and Spanish emigrants, contributing hugely to the dialogue among all people and cultures.
He has written 4 books: “Ecologia: Salviamo Anche la Musica”, “Semiminime”, “When Bach Was an Irish Man and Mozart a Gipsy Boy” and “Heyoka: Il Giullare dell'Anima”.

Background and Collaborations 

Antonio began playing jazz and classical piano at the age of 3. He graduated in piano at the conservatory Luigi Cherubini in Florence, where he also studied trumpet. He founded the Florence Jazz Society at the age of 16, and a few years later the International Folk Group, which became the group Whisky Trail. This name refers to the journey of the Irish emigrants to America and the meeting with the African people which, pursuant to Breschi's belief, gave birth to jazz. In fact among the many original titles of his albums were "Irish Meet The Blues" (his first solo album), "When Jazz Was An Irish Baby", "On The Irish Side Of Blues Street" and "Bound For America".

Between 1970 and 1973 he spent long periods in the USA in Alabama and Louisiana to explore the roots of blues, discovering the strong influence of Irish music in jazz, and performing with old jazz traditional musicians. These experiences are described in his tale “Alabama”.
Still very young he appears in 1972 in Auburn, Alabama, playing with the "Auburn University Orchestra" and jazz trombonist Urbie Green. Then in 1980 he appeared in Rome with jazz violinist Stephane Grappelli for the first RAI (Italian National Television) Concert For United Europe. In 1985 he concluded the International Jazz Festival of Poland in Kalisz, together with South African pianist Abdullah Ibrahim (also known as Dollar Brand), and in the same year he performed for the National Spanish Television in the stadium of Alcalá de Henares accompanied at cajon by Antonio Carmona De Los Abichuelas, leader of group Ketama. Antonio Carmona also participated in his flamenco album "Punta Umbria" and "Al Kamar", a fusion between flamenco, Arabian and Irish music. The broadcasting "Fin De Siglos" announced him as "the new Keith Jarrett from the Mediterranean".

In Ireland he started a long collaboration and friendship with Ronnie Drew of The Dubliners, who participated in many of Antonio's albums, the most significant called "From Dublin to Bilbao". Then later he was on stage in Cesena, Italy, with Rumanian pan flute player Gheorghe Zamfir, in Istanbul with the gipsy Turkish clarinet player Selim Sesler, in Paris with African saxophone player Manu Dibango and rock blues French singer Jacques Higelin.
He made many tours in Italy, Ireland and Switzerland with Irish musicians Máirtín O'Connor (De Dannan), Andy Irvine, Planxty, Dolores Keane (De Dannan), John Faulkner, Johnny McCarthy, Joe McHugh, Maurice Lennon (Stockton's Wing), Gerry and Annie O' Donnell, many of whom participated in Antonio's albums. In the Basque Country he started a strong relationship with national Basque singer Benito Lertxundi, who participated in his albums "Mezulari" and "Donostia", and Basque poet Josè Angel Irigaray, who created together with Antonio the album of poems and music called "Zeharbidetan". He also participated in his work "Orekan", which in Basque language means "harmoy among the people".

In 2008 he began a strong collaboration with José Seves, leader of group Inti Illimani, who sings in his album "Nomadic Aura".
Among the many musicians that appear in his live performances and in his albums are Persian percussionist Alì Tajbakhsh, African singer Gabin Dabiré, Cathy Jordan (Dervish), Brid Ni Mhaoileoin, flamenco guitarists Juan Martin, Tomas De Los Reyes, Balen Lopez De Munain, Arabian violinist Jamal Ouassini (director of Tangery Orchestra), Biancastella Croce, Sergio Candotti, Elena Vicini, Mia Froelicher, Massimo Giuntini, Mario Serraglio, Vincenzo De Luci and many more.

Recently Antonio appeared in Ireland in duo with singer Donovan and special guest Chris De Burgh, and with Eoin Dillon (Kila).
Currently he is playing in trio with his daughter Consuelo Nerea (singer, fiddle and bodhrán player) and celloist Davide Viterbo (who both participated with the music and production of most of Antonio's albums since 2001) and sometimes in quartet with oboist Enio Marfoli, who participated in the album "Boletus Edulis: Suite For Piano And Oboe".

Film, theatre, ballet, music education and music therapy 
Breschi composed the music for the 13 documentary film named Il Linguaggio Dei Luoghi (The Language of Places) by film director Folco Quilici, and for many other documentaries by the same film director (Le Alpi, Le Isole, etc.). He composed the music for the movie Le Colline del Garda by film director Franco Piavoli, for the Irish film The Nock by film director Dennis MacArdle.

He composed the music for Richard the Third by Shakespeare for actor Giorgio Albertazzi. He also created together with Zappalá Dance and Sicilian Ballet the work Mediterraneo, le antiche sponde del future (The Ancient Shores of the Future) which was performed all over Italy, Spain and North Africa.

He created four television serials named Il Suono E La Terra (The Sound and the Land) for the Italian television channel RAI 3 all based on his musical journey and his work with the children. Antonio created, performed and directed the fairytale "The Woman Of The Sea", also for children, produced by Teatro Comunale of Florence with the help of film directors Franco Piavoli, Ermanno Olmi and Mario Monicelli. This fairytale has been performed all over Italy and Switzerland. Later Antonio created a new version of it with Swiss theatre director Michel Poletti, produced by the International Locarno Puppets Festival.

In 1976 he created the music laboratory for children "Pistoia Ragazzi" in Pistoia, Italy and repeated the same experiences later in Zurich with emigrants and children, all this experience described in his book "Ecologia: Salviamo Anche La Musica". He also performed and still is performing concerts, shows for children and workshops all over the world.

His music has also been used for therapy. He personally did music laboratory for handicapped,  homeless, drug addicts, immigrants and minority groups.
The World Music Magazine of Barcelona wrote "his music is a caress that makes us feel human at least for a few moments".

Discography 

 
 Irish Meet the Blues (1980)
 Bound for America (1981)
 Far Off Hills… (1982)
 Ode to Ireland (1982)
 Linguaggio dei Luoghi (1983)
 Vingone: Canzoni di una Esperienza (1984)
 Mezulari (1985)
 Tierras, Mares y Memorias (EP ‒ 1986)
 Punta Umbria (1987)
 Al Kamar (1988)
 Orekan (1993)
 At the Edge of the Night (1994)
 Toscana (1996)
 Songs of the North (1996)
 My Irish Portrait (1997)
 Song for Carla (EP ‒ 1998)
 Irish Airs (1998)
 Donostia (1999)
 When Bach Was an Irishman (2002)
 Zeharbidetan (2004)
 The New Orleans Jig (2005)
 Nomadic Aura (2009)
 When Jazz Was an Irish Baby (2009)
 Ready to Sail (2011)
 Viaje Gitano (EP ‒ 2013)
 Dancing Waves (2014)

Collaborations 

With Whisky Trail:

 Canzoni d’Amore e di Lotta del Popolo Irlandese (1975)
 Canti e Danze del Popolo Irlandese (1977)
 Miriana (1979)

With Jane Cassidy:

 Waves of Time (1982)

With Benito Lertxundi:

 Gauko Ele Ixolen Baladak (1985)
 Mauleko Bidean... Izatearen Mugagabean (1987)

With Matteo Podda:

 La ballata di Sacco e Vanzetti (2012)

Bibliography 

 Ecologia: salviamo anche la musica! (1979)
 Semiminime (1996)
 Heyoka, il giullare dell'anima (2006)
 When Bach was an Irish man and Mozart a gipsy boy (2015)

References

External links
Antonio Breschi official site
Antonio Breschi Farewell to Ronnie Drew

1950 births
Living people
Italian male composers
Italian male pianists
21st-century pianists
21st-century Italian male musicians